The Remonstrance Bureau was an important government agency during the Song and Jurchen Jin dynasties. It also existed briefly during the Ming dynasty between 1380 and 1382. Its main function was to scrutinize documents between the emperor and the central government (Zhongshu Sheng and Menxia Sheng), and criticize proposals and policy decisions based on moral and propriety reasons.

The office was first created during the Song dynasty in 1017 or 1020, but it only became important after 1032 during Emperor Renzong of Song's reign when it was significantly staffed. Thereafter, the Remonstrance Bureau performed independently of the central government.

References 

 

Government of the Song dynasty
Government of the Jin dynasty (1115–1234)
Government of the Ming dynasty